Carl Frederick Falkenberg,  (4 February 1897 – 7 October 1980) was a Canadian First World War flying ace, credited with 17 aerial victories. Falkenberg was a personal friend of Canadian Prime Minister Lester B. Pearson.

Notes

1897 births
1980 deaths
Canadian Army officers
Canadian aviators
Canadian people of Swedish descent
Canadian World War I flying aces
Recipients of the Air Force Cross (United Kingdom)
Recipients of the Distinguished Flying Cross (United Kingdom)
Royal Air Force officers
Royal Canadian Air Force officers
Royal Flying Corps officers
Canadian military personnel of World War I

Carl Frederick
Barons of Sweden